Albion is an unincorporated community in Red River County, Texas, United States. It is located along the Red River where SH 37 crosses it.

References

Unincorporated communities in Red River County, Texas
Unincorporated communities in Texas